Christopher Cole may refer to:

Christopher Okoro Cole (1921–1990), president of Sierra Leone, 1971
Christopher Cole (Royal Navy officer) (1770–1836), British Royal Navy officer and politician

See also
Chris Cole (disambiguation)